Mayland Community College is a public community college in Spruce Pine, North Carolina.  The college also operates learning centers in Newland and Burnsville. The name of the college is derived from the three counties it primarily serves: Mitchell, Avery, and Yancey. It is part of the North Carolina Community College System.

Mayland Community College was first chartered as Mayland Technical Institute in February 1970 by the General Assembly of North Carolina upon recommendations by the State Board of Education, the Advisory Budget Commission, and Governor Robert W. Scott. The president of the college is Dr. John C. Boyd. The school's nickname is the Mountain Lions.

Mayland offers a variety of curriculum programs, including numerous college transfer options, as well as nursing, adult education, distance learning, and dual enrollment for high school students. To assist the local workforce, MCC provides several workforce development and continuing education courses that directly serve the needs of local and regional business and industries, as well as the civic and cultural interests of the community.

References

External links
Official website

Two-year colleges in the United States
North Carolina Community College System colleges